The Copa do Brasil was established in the 1989 season and Cláudio Duarte won the first edition with Grêmio. Luiz Felipe Scolari was the first manager to win the competition several times and is the manager with the most overall wins in the competition with four. He is followed by Mano Menezes who has three wins in the Copa do Brasil. Mano Menezes was also the first manager to win the tournament consecutively. Levir Culpi and Renato Gaúcho are the other managers to have won the Copa do Brasil more than once. Abel Ferreira from Portugal was the first foreign manager to win the competition.

Winning managers

Managers with multiple titles

References

Managers
Copa do Brasil